The 1908–09 Williams Ephs men's ice hockey season was the 6th season of play for the program.

Season
After a tremendous season in 1908, Williams attempted to build on that success by scheduling four games against teams from the Intercollegiate Hockey Association. While it was not surprising that the Ephs lost many of those games, failing to win any of their first five games was a bit of a setback. Much of the hand-wringing ended when the team trounced Cornell 8–1, beginning a 4-game winning streak to end the season. Williams also played their first games against eventual long-time rival Amherst.

Roster

Standings

Schedule and Results

|-
!colspan=12 style=";" | Regular Season

References

Williams Ephs men's ice hockey seasons
Williams
Williams
Williams
Williams